Macroglossum spilonotum is a moth of the  family Sphingidae. It is known from Papua New Guinea.

References

Macroglossum
Moths described in 1912